The Mundo Novo tree frog (Boana marginata) is a species of frog in the family Hylidae. It is endemic to south-eastern Brazil where it is known from the easternmost Rio Grande do Sul and adjacent southeastern Santa Catarina. Its natural habitats are forested mountain slopes near streams with clear running water. The eggs are deposited on vegetation hanging into the water. It is a common species although habitat loss and water pollution are threats.

References

Boana
Endemic fauna of Brazil
Amphibians of Brazil
Amphibians described in 1887
Taxonomy articles created by Polbot